Trou du Cru is a very strong, pungent French cheese, developed by the cheesemaker Robert Berthaut in the early 1980s.  It is a pasteurized cow's milk Époisses cheese from the Burgundy region.

The soft cheese is ivory-yellow in color, with an orange, edible rind. For four weeks during its maturation, each small cheese is washed individually with Marc de Bourgogne, a strong local brandy, which imparts a straw-like flavor to the cheese. 

Trou du Cru is molded in small (1.5 in, 60 g) rounds, packaged in paper cups; and in medium (4.5 in, 250 g) wheels, packaged in wooden containers.

References

External links
 English-language site of Fromagerie Berthaut, originator and current producer of Trou du Cru

Cow's-milk cheeses
Epoisses de Bourgogne
French cheeses